Ga-Lepadima is a village in Ga-Matlala in the Blouberg Local Municipality of the Capricorn District Municipality of the Limpopo province of South Africa. It is located a mere 2 km north of Tibane on the Matlala Road.

References 

Populated places in the Blouberg Local Municipality